Paul David McShane (born 6 January 1986) is an Irish professional football coach and former player who is currently the Professional Development Phase coach at Premier League side Manchester United.

Born in Wicklow, Ireland, McShane moved to England when he was 16 to play for Manchester United, with whom he won the 2003 FA Youth Cup. He had loan stints with Walsall and Brighton & Hove Albion before making a permanent move to West Bromwich Albion in 2006. He joined Sunderland a year later, but spent the 2008–09 season on loan to Hull City before making a permanent move there in 2009. He spent six years with Hull, broken up by loan spells with Barnsley and Crystal Palace, before joining Reading in 2015. After four years with Reading, he moved to Rochdale but was released following the COVID-19 pandemic in July 2021, when he made a return to Manchester United as a player-coach for the club's under-23s team. He retired from playing at the end of the season, when he took up a youth coaching role full-time.

McShane represented the Republic of Ireland at every level from Under-15s upwards. He made six appearances for the under-21s before making his debut for the senior team in 2006. He was named in the Ireland squad for UEFA Euro 2012, but did not make an appearance at the tournament. He earned his 33rd and final cap in March 2016, although he was named as a standby player for UEFA Euro 2016.

Early life
Born in Wicklow, County Wicklow, McShane started his career with Greystones United, as well as playing for Newtown Juniors and his secondary school, St. David's. He later joined St Joseph's Boys, a club based in south Dublin.

Club career

Manchester United
In the summer of 2002, he signed for Manchester United. In December 2004, he was loaned to Walsall, where he played four league matches and scored once against Sheffield Wednesday. He played for Manchester United in the final of the 2003 FA Youth Cup in which they defeated Middlesbrough 3–1.

He played in pre-season friendly matches and was given the squad number 34, but did not make a full debut for Manchester United.

Brighton & Hove Albion
In August 2005, he moved to Brighton & Hove Albion on an initial five-month loan deal. The loan was later extended for the whole of the 2005–06 season. McShane was voted Player of the Season by the supporters, as well as the away supporters' Player of the Season.

West Bromwich Albion
On 10 August 2006, McShane and fellow 2003 FA Youth Cup winner Luke Steele moved to West Bromwich Albion on a permanent basis in a deal that saw Tomasz Kuszczak join United on a season-long loan with a permanent deal confirmed for the following summer. He made his debut for West Brom in a 3–0 win over Leyton Orient in the League Cup on 24 August 2006. His goal against Leeds United in the FA Cup on 6 January 2007 sent Albion on their way to a 3–1 victory. It was the first of three goals he scored in 42 appearances for the club.

Sunderland
On 26 July 2007, McShane joined Sunderland for an initial £1.5 million fee. McShane's first match for the Black Cats ended in success – his performance helping Sunderland to a clean sheet and a 1–0 win over Tottenham Hotspur.

Hull City

On 29 August 2008, Sunderland accepted a loan offer for McShane from Hull City, who were newly promoted to the Premier League. While playing for Hull, he scored the opening goal at Anfield in a league match versus Liverpool on 13 December 2008. His last match during his loan spell for Hull was an FA Cup victory over Newcastle United on 14 January 2009, as he was recalled to Sunderland by manager Ricky Sbragia.

On 30 August 2009, McShane rejoined Hull on a permanent transfer for an undisclosed fee. On 16 February 2011, he joined Barnsley on a two-month loan, but Hull were given the option to recall him after 28 days. He scored his first goal for Barnsley in a 4–2 win over Bristol City on 9 April 2011.

On 13 January 2012, McShane joined Crystal Palace on a one-month loan. McShane's loan at Palace was extended until the end of the 2011–12 season on 31 January 2012.

The 2012–13 season started more positively for McShane than his previous few seasons at Hull as he enjoyed regular appearances under new manager Steve Bruce, often being deployed as part of Hull's new system of a three-man defence. He scored his first goal in over four years on 1 December 2012, shouldering the ball home to help Hull to a 2–1 victory at Nottingham Forest. More solid performances at the heart of the Tigers' defence followed for McShane in 27 appearances that season, until he was ruled out for the rest of the campaign with ankle ligament damage suffered in a match, again against Nottingham Forest. With his contract running out at the end of the season, this injury put McShane's long-term future at the club in doubt. However, McShane returned to the team unexpectedly before the end of the season. On 4 May 2013, McShane started on the final day of the season in a match against Cardiff City, a match which the Tigers had to win to guarantee promotion to the Premier League. In the 63rd minute of the match, an inswinging corner from Robbie Brady was met by the right foot of McShane, who saw the ball nestle in the corner of the net to give his team the lead. This meant the Irishman had potentially scored the goal to promote Hull (although Watford's subsequent loss to Leeds United meant they achieved this regardless). In the aftermath of the match, Stephen Quinn, talking of his teammate, said "Mac's my age and I want to be like him. I want to structure my life like him. He dedicates his whole life to playing. He's had knock-downs in the past but that's the measure of the man. That's why I like him even more, he comes back from anything like that. He's an almighty man who you want in the trenches wherever you go." Steve Bruce later confirmed that McShane would be offered a new contract for the next season in the top flight. On 8 July 2013, McShane signed a new two-year deal with Hull City.

McShane's 2013–14 Premier League season started slowly as he was mainly named as a substitute for the opening two months of the campaign, but was finally included in the starting eleven away against Tottenham, a match in which he was successful in keeping the home side out up until a controversial 80th-minute penalty. He started the next match, again away at Tottenham but this time in the League Cup three days later, and put in a similarly impressive performance, scoring a header in the 99th minute past a helpless Brad Friedel. He followed this up next Saturday with another impressive display, earning the Tigers a clean sheet in a 1–0 win over Sunderland. On 17 May 2014, he played as a substitute in the 2014 FA Cup Final against Arsenal.

On 28 May 2015, Hull City released McShane and five other players who were out of contract at the end of the 2014–15 season.

Reading
On 2 July 2015, McShane signed a three-year contract with Reading. He made his first professional appearance for the Royals on 8 August 2015 in a 2–1 defeat away to Birmingham City. McShane's first goal for Reading came during a 3–1 victory against his former club West Bromwich Albion on 20 February 2016, where he scored the equaliser during the FA Cup Fifth Round match at the Madejski Stadium.

He was released by Reading at the end of the 2018–19 season.

Rochdale 
On 10 October 2019, it was announced that McShane had joined League One side Rochdale on a short-term contract until January 2020. This was extended by 18 months in mid-January 2020.

Return to Manchester United
On 23 July 2021, he returned to former club Manchester United as a player-coach, with the intention of being used as an overage player in under-23s matches while coaching in the youth set-up. He played in the 2021–22 EFL Trophy wearing the number 62, but retired from playing at the end of the season and took up a full-time role as the club's Professional Development Phase coach.

International career

McShane received his first senior international call-up to the Republic of Ireland squad from manager Steve Staunton on 25 September 2006, for the UEFA Euro 2008 qualifiers against Cyprus and the Czech Republic. An injury to Andy O'Brien and the suspension of Richard Dunne (the two central defenders that had started the match against Cyprus) meant that McShane was given his first international cap against the Czech Republic on 11 October 2006. The match ended in a 1–1 draw, with McShane being named man of the match. McShane was part of the team that missed out on place at the 2010 FIFA World Cup after being defeated by France in Paris in a play-off, and was the Irish player directly behind Thierry Henry when Henry twice handballed late in extra-time before crossing for William Gallas to score an illegitimate, but accepted, goal.

On 29 May 2012, he was called in from the international wilderness to the Irish UEFA Euro 2012 squad following an injury to Kevin Foley ahead of the tournament.

Style of play
Eamon Dunphy once compared McShane to Spanish international defender Sergio Ramos, labelling Sergio Ramos "...like Paul McShane on steroids".

Career statistics

Club

International

Honours
Manchester United U18
FA Youth Cup: 2002–03

Hull City
Football League Championship runner-up: 2012–13
FA Cup runner-up: 2013–14

Republic of Ireland
Nations Cup: 2011

References

External links

Profile at the Football Association of Ireland website

1986 births
Living people
People from Wicklow (town)
Association footballers from County Wicklow
Republic of Ireland association footballers
Association football defenders
Manchester United F.C. players
Walsall F.C. players
Brighton & Hove Albion F.C. players
West Bromwich Albion F.C. players
Sunderland A.F.C. players
Hull City A.F.C. players
Barnsley F.C. players
Crystal Palace F.C. players
Reading F.C. players
Rochdale A.F.C. players
English Football League players
Premier League players
Republic of Ireland under-21 international footballers
Republic of Ireland international footballers
UEFA Euro 2012 players
Republic of Ireland expatriate association footballers
Irish expatriate sportspeople in England
Expatriate footballers in England
FA Cup Final players
Association football coaches
Manchester United F.C. non-playing staff